Joseph Morris Bachelor also known as Joseph Morris (May 17, 1887 near Sharonville, Ohio – December 5, 1947 in Hamilton, Ohio) was an American author, poet, editor and educator.

Bachelor was educated at Miami University (A.B., 1911) and Harvard University (A.M. 1912). As an undergraduate at Miami University, he joined a local organization which later became the national fraternity, Phi Kappa Tau. He is considered the author of the fraternity's Ritual and wrote the lyrics to its first song, with Joseph W. Clokey writing the music. After teaching English at Cornell College in Iowa (1913-1917), he worked as an editor for the Century Company in New York City where he was definitions editor of The New Century Dictionary in two volumes. He returned in 1927 to teach at his alma mater, Miami University where he remained until his death in 1947. He was a popular and rigorous professor teaching Shakespeare and a course he developed called "Words." The land is today known as the Bachelor Wildlife and Game Reserve. He collaborated with other professors on at least ten English textbooks and edited a series of poetry collections (under his pen name Joseph Morris) in collaboration with St. Clair Adams which included poems by Bachelor and Adams.

Bachelor fell ill at his Oxford, Ohio home and died in a Hamilton, Ohio hospital on December 5, 1947.  He was buried in the Bachelor family plot at Spring Grove Cemetery in Cincinnati.

An academic building on the Miami University campus was named Bachelor Hall in 1979 as a memorial.

References

External links 
 
 
 
 

1887 births
1947 deaths
Poets from Ohio
Miami University alumni
Harvard University alumni
Miami University faculty
Cornell College faculty
Burials at Spring Grove Cemetery
Infectious disease deaths in Ohio
20th-century American poets